Claude Ruiz Picasso (born 15 May 1947) is a French photographer, cinematographer, movie director, visual artist, graphic designer, and businessman. He is a child of Françoise Gilot and Pablo Picasso and the older brother of Paloma Picasso. By a wish on Gilot's part, he was named after Claude Gillot, a pioneering French Rococo artist and mentor to fellow artist Jean-Antoine Watteau. His name was Claude Gilot until age 12. In 1968 he met Sara Lavner (Schultz), a young woman from Brooklyn. Sara and Claude married in 1969 and divorced in 1972. He was a photographer in New York City when his father died. At the time, he had experienced a period of estrangement from his father due to his mother's 1964 memoir Life with Picasso. His father's legacy nevertheless proved important to him and he established the "Picasso Administration" to look after copyright and other legal matters.

Claude lived in New York between 1967 and 1974. He was Richard Avedon's photographic assistant for almost a year, and studied cinema and mise-en-scène at the Actors Studio. He also worked as a photojournalist for Time Life, Vogue and Saturday Review.

Awards
Claude Picasso has been decorated with the Legion d'Honneur in 2011 for his personal work as photographer, cinematographer, and visual artist, as well as his efforts to administer his father's heritage.

References

Works cited

 

French photographers
French photojournalists
1947 births
Living people
French people of Spanish descent
Recipients of the Legion of Honour
20th-century French male artists
21st-century French male artists
Pablo Picasso